Rasam  (English: Custom) is a 2014 Pakistani social drama serial directed by Asim Ali. It was premiered on 1 May 2017. The serial is written by Samina Aijaz and produced by Gold Bridge Media in collaboration with Habib Jaan. The serial features Sumbul Iqbal, Junaid Khan, Hassan Niazi and Javaid Sheikh in lead roles. The serial is based on how a mistake during performing tradition changes the lives of Ali and Amber.

Plot
Everything is going well until all is lost, not just for Ali (Junaid Khan) but for Amber (Sumbul Iqbal) as well and only for what, a stupid mistake committed in a mehndi ceremony by a family member which leaves everyone in shock. They say these Rasam's are the flavors of our wedding ceremonies but not for Amber. What is it that the future holds for girls like Amber, isn't she a victim of these Rasam's

Cast 
 Sumbul Iqbal as Amber
 Junaid Khan as Ali
 Hassan Niazi as Shehzad
 Javed Sheikh as Sattar, Father of Amber
 Ghazala Kaifee as Asma, Mother of Amber
 Rija Ali as Tajwar, Sister of Ali
 Amir Qureshi as Asad, Husband of Tajwar
 Kaif Ghaznavi as Noreen, Second wife of Ali
 Humaira Ali as Yasmeen, Mother of Ali
 Ali Anwar as Ahmed, Brother of Amber
 Beena Chaudhary as Zahida, Phuppo of Ali
 Faria Sheikh as Hina, Daughter of Zahida
 Birjees Farooqi, Mother of Shehzad
 Sonia Rao as Shela, Friend and colleague of Amber
 Mahrukh Rizvi as Reena, Love interest of Asad

Interruption
In May 2014, Geo TV was banned by PEMRA for airing blasphemous content on Geo Entertainment in its morning show Utho Jago Pakistan.Therefore, the serial was on hiatus along with other serials of the channel for few months.

Reception
The serial could not do better on the ratings charts due to the unavailability of the channel in some parts of the country. It was also criticized by the viewers for its weak storyline and flaws in direction.

References

External links 
 Rasam-Official Site

2014 Pakistani television series debuts
Geo TV original programming
Pakistani drama television series
Urdu-language television shows